Monica Vișan (born August 5, 1979, in Drobeta-Turnu Severin, Romania) is a Romanian mathematician at the University of California, Los Angeles who specialized in PDE and is well known for her work on the nonlinear Schrödinger equation.

Education and career
Vișan earned a bachelor's degree at the University of Bucharest in 2002.
She became a student of Terence Tao at the University of California, Los Angeles (UCLA), where she completed her doctorate in 2006. Her dissertation was The Defocusing Energy-Critical Nonlinear Schrödinger Equation in Dimensions Five and Higher.

After postdoctoral research at the Institute for Advanced Study, Vișan became an assistant professor in the mathematics department at the University of Chicago in 2008. She returned to UCLA as a faculty member in 2009, and (keeping her appointment at UCLA) spent 2010–2011 as Harrington Faculty Fellow at the University of Texas at Austin. She won a Sloan Research Fellowship in 2010.

Selected publications
With Herbert Koch and Daniel Tătaru, Vișan is the author of the book Dispersive Equations and Nonlinear Waves: Generalized Korteweg–de Vries, Nonlinear Schrödinger, Wave and Schrödinger Maps (Birkhäuser/Springer, 2014).

Her research papers include:

References

External links
Home page

1979 births
Living people
21st-century Romanian mathematicians
Institute for Advanced Study people
PDE theorists
Sloan Research Fellows
University of Bucharest alumni
University of California, Los Angeles alumni
University of California, Los Angeles faculty
University of Chicago faculty